Albert Dess (born 17 April 1947) is a German politician who served as Member of the European Parliament (MEP) from 2004 until 2019. He is a member of the Christian Social Union in Bavaria, part of the European People's Party.

Education and early career
 1966: Agricultural college (graduated
 1979: Master's in agriculture
 Secondary occupation as farmer
 Worked in commerce and industry
 Managing director of a farming cooperative
 1977: Full-time farmer/training establishment

Political career

Career in local politics
 1974: District Chairman of the Junge Union
 1981: Member of the CSU district executive
 1984: Municipal Chairman of the CSU
 District Chairman (1987), Regional Vice-Chairman (1989–1995) and Regional Chairman (1995) of the CSU Agricultural Association
 1989: Member of the CSU district executive
 1997: Member of the CSU Regional Executive Committee
 1972–1996: Municipal Councillor, Berngau
 1978: District Councillor, Neumarkt/Oberpfalz
 1984–1996: Vice-Chairman of Neumarkt/Oberpfalz district council
 1984–1996: Mayor of Berngau

Member of the German Parliament, 1990–2004
 1992–2004: Farm policy spokesman for the CSU Regional Group in the Bundestag
 1997–2004: Member of the CDU/CSU Group Executive Committee
 2000–2004: Chairman of the CSU Regional Group working party for Agriculture, Consumer Protection, Environment, Transport, Building and Energy

Member of the European Parliament, 2004–2019
Dess was a member of the European Parliament's Committee on Agriculture and Rural Development (AGRI). He was a substitute for the Committee on International Trade (INTRA), a member of the delegation for relations with Mercosur and a substitute for the delegation to the ACP-EU Joint Parliamentary Assembly.

In May 2018, Dess announced that he would not stand in the 2019 European elections but instead resign from active politics by the end of the parliamentary term.

Controversy 
Outside Germany, Dess is best known for trying to introduce in the European Parliament a Volkswagen-written piece of legislation that would have exempted a whole class of vehicle from pollution controls. The proposal was dropped after the Volkswagen emissions violation scandal erupted and Dress has thus far refused requests to comment on his actions.

Recognition
 1998: Bundesverdienstkreuz with ribbon

See also
 2004 European Parliament election in Germany

References

External links

 
 
 

1947 births
Living people
MEPs for Germany 2004–2009
Recipients of the Cross of the Order of Merit of the Federal Republic of Germany
Christian Social Union in Bavaria MEPs
MEPs for Germany 2009–2014
MEPs for Germany 2014–2019
Members of the Bundestag for Bavaria
Members of the Bundestag 2002–2005
Members of the Bundestag 1998–2002
Members of the Bundestag 1994–1998
Members of the Bundestag 1990–1994